Thornhill is a provincial electoral district in Ontario, Canada, that has been represented in the Legislative Assembly of Ontario since 1999.

It covers the community of Thornhill, Ontario, which is made up of portions of Vaughan and Markham, and was created in 1999 from parts of Markham and York Centre ridings.

It consists of the part of the city of Vaughan that is east of Highway 400 and south of Rutherford Road, and the part of the city of Markham west of Bayview Avenue.

It is the only riding in Ontario with a Jewish plurality. 32.8% of the population is Jewish, the highest in the province.

Members of Provincial Parliament

Election results

2007 electoral reform referendum

References

Sources
Elections Ontario Past Election Results
Map of riding for 2018 election

Ontario provincial electoral districts
Politics of Markham, Ontario
Politics of Vaughan